Mladen Lukić may refer to:
Mladen Lukić (politician), Serbian politician
Mladen Lukić (footballer), Serbian footballer
Mladen Lukić (musician), Serbian musician